Luca Ceccaroli (born 5 July 1995) is a Sammarinese footballer who plays as a midfielder for Tre Penne and the San Marino national team.

Career
Ceccaroli made his international debut for San Marino on 13 October 2019 in a UEFA Euro 2020 qualifying match against Scotland, which finished as a 0–6 away loss.

Career statistics

International

References

External links
 
 
 

1995 births
Living people
Sammarinese footballers
Association football midfielders
A.S.D. Victor San Marino players
F.C. Domagnano players
S.P. Tre Penne players
San Marino youth international footballers
San Marino under-21 international footballers
San Marino international footballers
Sammarinese expatriate footballers
Sammarinese expatriate sportspeople in Italy
Campionato Sammarinese di Calcio players
Expatriate footballers in Italy